Inella  is a genus of minute sea snails with left-handed shell-coiling, marine gastropod molluscs in the family Triphoridae.

Species
Species in the genus Inella  include:
 Inella apexbilirata Rolán & Fernández-Garcés, 2008
 Inella compsa (Dall, 1927)
 Inella differens Rolán & Lee, 2008
 Inella dinea (Dall, 1927)
 Inella enopla (Dall, 1927)
 Inella faberi Rolán & Fernández-Garcés, 2008
 Inella gaesona (Dall, 1927)
 Inella gemmulata (A. Adams & Reeve, 1850) 
 Inella harryleei Rolán & Fernández-Garcés, 2008
 Inella longissima (Dall, 1881)
 Inella meteora (Dall, 1927)
 Inella noduloides Rolán & Fernández-Garcés, 2008
 Inella pinarena Espinosa, Ortea, Fernandez-Garcés & Moro, 2007
 Inella pompona (Dall, 1927)
 Inella pseudolongissima Rolán & Fernández-Garcés, 2008
 Inella pseudotorticula Rolán & Lee, 2008
 Inella sarissa (Dall, 1889)
 Inella sentoma (Dall, 1927)
 Inella slapcinskyi Rolán & Fernández-Garcés, 2008
 Inella undebermuda Rolán & Lee, 2008
 Inella unicornium Simone, 2006

The Indo-Pacific Molluscan Database (OBIS) also mentions the following species :
 Inella acicula Laseron, 1958
 Inella aculeata Kosuge, 1962
 Inella asperrima (Hinds, 1843)
 Inella carinata Marshall, 1983
 Inella chrysalis Kosuge, 1963
 Inella gigas (Hinds, 1843)
 Inella granicostata Kosuge, 1962
 Inella hervieri (Kosuge, 1962)
 Inella intercalaris Marshall, 1983
 Inella japonica Kuroda & Kosuge, 1963
 Inella kimblae Marshall, 1983
 Inella lanceolata Kosuge, 1962
 Inella maxillaris (Hinds, 1843)
 Inella micans (Hinds, 1843)
 Inella numerosa Jousseaume, 1898
 Inella obliqua (May, 1915)
 Inella obtusa Marshall, 1983
 Inella pavimenta (Laseron, 1958)
 Inella perimensis Jousseaume, 1898
 Inella sculptus (Hinds, 1843)
 Inella spicula Kosuge, 1962
 Inella spina (Verco, 1909)
 Inella subfenestrata Kosuge, 1962
 Inella verluysi (Schepman, 1909)
 Inella verrucosa (Adams & Reeve, 1850)
 Inella vittatus (Hinds, 1843)

The Database of Western Atlantic Marine Mollusca also mentions the following species :
 Inella bigemma (Watson, 1880)
 Inella colon (Dall, 1881)
 Inella inflata (Watson, 1880)
 Inella intermedia (Dall, 1881)
 Inella torticula (Dall, 1881)
 Inella triserialis (Dall, 1881)

The website Gastropods.com also includes the following species :
 Inella clathratus (Gould, A.A., 1861)
 Inella distorta (Laseron, C.F., 1958)
 Inella hungerfordi (Sowerby, G.B. III, 1914)
 Inella iniqua (Jousseaume, F.P., 1884)
 Inella lutaoi Chang, C.K. & W.L. Wu, 2006
 Inella mistura (Laseron, C.F., 1958)
 Inella monovitta (Laseron, C.F., 1958)
 Inella multigyrata Yokoyama, M., 1920
 Inella pyramidalis (Adams, A. & L.A. Reeve, 1850)
 Inella rushii (Dall, W.H., 1889)
 Inella ryosukei (Kosuge, S., 1963)
 Inella spina (Verco, J.C., 1909)

References

Triphoridae